The 2022 Wyoming Secretary of State election was held on November 8, 2022, to elect the Secretary of State of Wyoming. On April 18, 2022, incumbent Republican Edward Buchanan announced that he would run for re-election, but on May 17 he reversed this decision, choosing not to seek a second term. State Representative Chuck Gray won the Republican nomination on August 16 with the backing of former president Donald Trump. He is a supporter of Trump's claim that he won the 2020 election. Gray was unopposed in the general election.

Republican primary

Candidates

Nominee
Chuck Gray, state representative

Eliminated in primary
Mark Armstrong, geologist and candidate for U.S. Senate in 2020
Tara Nethercott, state senator

Withdrew
Edward Buchanan, incumbent secretary of state
Dan Dockstader (remained on ballot), President of the Wyoming Senate (endorsed Nethercott)

Endorsements

Campaign
Both Tara Nethercott and Chuck Gray made "election integrity" a campaign focus, though with competing approaches to the subject.

Chuck Gray was described by the Associated Press as "one of Wyoming's most Trump-like legislators". He briefly entered the 2022 House of Representatives election against Liz Cheney after her vote to impeach Trump over the January 6, 2021, U.S. Capitol attack, but failed to secure Trump's endorsement and withdrew to run for secretary of state. Gray attended the 2021 Maricopa County presidential ballot audit, and has advocated banning ballot drop boxes and instituting mandatory hand-counted election audits. He advocates the false position that the 2020 presidential election was stolen from Trump and has hosted screenings of Dinesh D'Souza's election conspiracy film 2000 Mules across the state. He has accused the media of refusing to cover evidence of electoral fraud. Gray was endorsed by Trump in August.

Tara Nethercott affirmed the 2020 election as secure, saying "there has been no objective evidence to indicate that the 2020 presidential election was stolen," and "continuing allegations to the contrary are undermining our country". Nethercott served on the 2017 Plan for Aging Voting Equipment Task Force, and her approach to election integrity involved shifting to machines without internet connectivity and streamlining the processing of absentee ballots. In 2022, she voted for a law that gave clerks the option to process absentee ballots received before election day. Gray voted against the bill, calling it an "awful piece of legislation".

Days before the August 16 primary election, Chuck Gray's campaign sent text messages to primary voters claiming Tara Nethercott was being sued for slander, was being investigated for violations of campaign finance law, and voted for a $30,000 pay raise for herself. In a fact check, WyoFile determined all three allegations to be untrue. Nethercott had previously sent mailers to voters criticizing Gray for personally loaning $300,000 to one of his previous campaigns. Given Gray's reported annual income of $11,000, the source of the funds was unclear. Former secretary of state Max Maxfield, who endorsed Nethercott, filed a federal complaint against Gray alleging the money had come from a political action committee rather than his finances. Gray countered that the money was an inheritance from his grandfather. When reached for comment by WyoFile about the anti-Nethercott texts, Gray declined to comment on the texts and instead accused Nethercott of lying in her mailer.

Results

General election

Predictions

Results

References

Secretary of State
Wyoming
Wyoming Secretary of State elections